Massachusetts Senate's 3rd Middlesex district in the United States is one of 40 legislative districts of the Massachusetts Senate. It covers portions of Middlesex county. Democrat Mike Barrett of Lexington has represented the district since 2013.

Locales represented
The district includes the following localities:
 Bedford
 Carlisle
 Chelmsford
 Concord
 Lexington
 Lincoln
 Sudbury
 Waltham
 Weston

Former locales
The district previously covered the following:
 Brighton, circa 1860s
 Cambridge, circa 1860s

Senators 
 John W. Bacon, circa 1859 
 Elmer Stevens
 Joseph Knox
 Charles Austin
 Charles V. Blanchard, circa 1911
 James Conlan Scanlan, circa 1935 
 Burton F. Faulkner, circa 1945 
 James J. Corbett, circa 1957 
 Denis L. McKenna, circa 1969 
 Stephen John McGrail, circa 1975
 John A. Brennan, Jr., circa 1979-1985 
 Richard R. Tisei, circa 1993 
 Susan Fargo, circa 2002 
 Michael J. Barrett, 2013-current

Images
Portraits of legislators

See also
 List of Massachusetts Senate elections
 List of Massachusetts General Courts
 List of former districts of the Massachusetts Senate
 Other Middlesex County districts of the Massachusett Senate: 1st, 2nd, 4th, 5th; 1st Essex and Middlesex; 2nd Essex and Middlesex; 1st Middlesex and Norfolk, 2nd Middlesex and Norfolk; Middlesex and Suffolk; Middlesex and Worcester; Norfolk, Bristol and Middlesex; 1st Suffolk and Middlesex; 2nd Suffolk and Middlesex
 Middlesex County districts of the Massachusetts House of Representatives: 1st, 2nd, 3rd, 4th, 5th, 6th, 7th, 8th, 9th, 10th, 11th, 12th, 13th, 14th, 15th, 16th, 17th, 18th, 19th, 20th, 21st, 22nd, 23rd, 24th, 25th, 26th, 27th, 28th, 29th, 30th, 31st, 32nd, 33rd, 34th, 35th, 36th, 37th

References

External links
 Ballotpedia
  (State Senate district information based on U.S. Census Bureau's American Community Survey).
 
 League of Women Voters of Sudbury

Senate
Government of Middlesex County, Massachusetts
Massachusetts Senate